The  was an international conflict in Nikolayevsk-on-Amur in the Russian Far East between Japan and the Far Eastern Republic during the Japanese intervention. The culmination was the execution of imprisoned Japanese prisoners of war and survivors of Japanese residents without trial from 23 to 31 May 1920, which followed after the armed conflict between the guerrillas and the Japanese army from 12 to 15 March 1920 in Nikolaevsk-on-Amur. A total of 129 Japanese prisoners and a number of local residents and guerrillas were held in the prison at that time. The destruction of the town and the fortress and the execution took place after the evacuation of the entire population due to the offensive of the Japanese army. The Nikolayevsk incident was used by Japan as a pretext to justify the retroactive occupation of Northern Sakhalin, which was occupied by the Japanese on 22 April 1920.

Nikolayevsk-on-Amur was occupied in September 1918 by the Imperial Japanese Army as part of Japan's Siberian Intervention force. In early February 1920, the town had a Japanese civilian community of around 450 people, and a military garrison of 350 men from the Imperial Japanese Army's 14th Infantry Division.  In addition to the Japanese presence, the Russian White Army housed a garrison of roughly 300 men. The total civilian population at the time was around 6,000. In January 1920, the town was surrounded by a partisan force nearly 4,000 strong under the command of Yakov Tryapitsyn, who was allied with the Bolshevik Red Army.

On 24 February 1920, realizing that he was outnumbered and far from reinforcement, the commander of the Japanese garrison  allowed Tryapitsyn's troops to enter the town under a flag of truce. However, Tryapitsyn began to round up and execute White Movement supporters, the only force holding his hand being the small Japanese garrison. On 10 March, he issued an ultimatum to the garrison to voluntarily disarm, to which he was sure the Japanese would not agree. Therefore, the Japanese intervened, launching a surprise attack on 12 March 1920.  The attack failed and most of the Japanese troops died. The remaining few only surrendered when the Japanese high command ordered them to do so. Even so, Tryapitsyn decided to take revenge, which resulted in the execution of the surviving garrison and the slaughter of all but 122 Japanese civilians – in all around 700 Japanese died shortly thereafter.

After this, he was free to start a reign of terror and execute all those civilians he deemed dangerous to his forces. Being short of ammunition, one of the methods to execute the victims was to stab them with a bayonet and thrust them in a hole under the ice of the river Amur. Several thousand inhabitants of the town were killed like this and with other execution methods.

In late May, as a Japanese relief expedition approached, Tryapitsyn executed all of the remaining inhabitants of the town, both Japanese and Russian, and burned the town to the ground.

The Japanese government lodged a protest against the Bolshevik government in Moscow, demanding compensation. The Russian government responded by capturing and executing Tryapitsyn; however, the Japanese government felt that this was not sufficient, and used the incident as a rationale to occupy the northern half of Sakhalin island, and to delay diplomatic recognition of the Soviet Union until 1925.

References

 Hara, Teruyuki. Niko Jiken no Shomondai (Problems in the Incident at Nikolaevsk-na-Amure) // Roshiashi Kekyuu, 1975, No. 23. 
 Gutman, Anatoly. Ella Lury Wiswell (trans.); Richard A. Pierce (ed.) The Destruction of Nikolaevsk-on-Amur, An Episode in the Russian Civil War in the Far East, 1920. Limestone Press (1993). 
 White, John Albert. The Siberian Intervention. Princeton University Press (1950)

External links 

Foreign relations of the Empire of Japan
Allied intervention in the Russian Civil War
Massacres in Russia
Military history of Japan
1920 in Russia
1920 in Japan
1920 in international relations
Japan–Soviet Union relations
February 1920 events
March 1920 events
Mass murder in 1920
Soviet war crimes
Massacres committed by China